Sky High Saunders (aka Skyhigh Saunders and Sky-High Saunders)is a 1927 American silent action film directed by Bruce M. Mitchell. The film stars Al Wilson (playing both "Sky-High" Saunders and his twin brother, Michael Saunders), Elsie Tarron and Frank Rice. Sky High Saunders was one of a series of films that showcased the exploits of the stunt pilots in Hollywood.

Plot
While searching for his twin brother, Michael Saunders (Al Wilson), whom his family believes was killed in combat, "Sky-High" Saunders discovers a gang of aircraft smugglers. The leader, George Delatour (Bud Osborne), is in love with schoolteacher Helen Leland (Elsie Tarron), whom Sky-High saves from the smuggler's unwelcome attentions, knocking him unconscious in a fight.

Mistaking Sky-High for Michael, Delatour seeks to get even but is convinced that he has been "seeing things." On the trail of the smugglers, Sky-High shoots down his brother's aircraft; Michael dies in his arms.

Sky-High keeps a rendezvous with the gang, disguised as his brother, and with aid from Army aircraft he dynamites their mountain stronghold while dealing with Delatour on the wings of his aircraft. Sky-High even ends up with his brother's girlfriend.

Cast

 Al Wilson as "Sky-High"' Saunders / Michael Saunders
 Elsie Tarron as Helen Leland
 Frank Rice as "Whispering" Hicks
 Bud Osborne as George Delatour
 Billy "Red" Jones as Kid

Production
Al Wilson was not only the star of Sky High Saunders but also flew as a "stunt pilot" in the film. After Wilson became a flying instructor and a short period as manager of the Mercury Aviation Company, founded by one of his students, Cecil B. DeMille, Wilson became more and more skilled in performing stunts, including wing-walking, and left the company to become a professional stunt pilot, specializing in Hollywood aviation films.

Production started on Sky High Saunders in 1927 at the newly-established Wilson Aero Service at Glendale Airport, California. Wilson had joined with his brother, Roy, another pilot, to create a fixed-base operation that not only worked on Hollywood films but also offered charter and passenger flights.

Wilson worked together with stuntmen like Frank Clarke and Wally Timm and also for film companies, including Universal Pictures. After numerous appearances in stunt roles, he started his career as an actor in 1923 with the serial The Eagle's Talons. Wilson produced his own movies until 1927, when he went back to work with Universal.

Reception
Aviation film historian Stephen Pendo, in Aviation in the Cinema (1985) said Sky High Saunders was only one of a long list of aviation films that showcased Wilson's talents. He alternately wrote, acted and flew in a career that "spanned more than 10 years, and he acted in more films than any other professional pilot."

References

Notes

Citations

Bibliography

 Pendo, Stephen. Aviation in the Cinema. Lanham, Maryland: Scarecrow Press, 1985. .
 Wynne, H. Hugh. The Motion Picture Stunt Pilots and Hollywood's Classic Aviation Movies. Missoula, Montana: Pictorial Histories Publishing Co., 1987. .

External links
 
 

1927 films
1920s action films
American action films
Films directed by Bruce M. Mitchell
American silent feature films
Associated Exhibitors films
American black-and-white films
1920s English-language films
1920s American films